Helfenstein can refer to:

 House of Helfenstein, a German noble family
 Helfenstein Castle, a ruined castle near Geislingen an der Steige, Baden-Württemberg, Germany; the former seat of the House of Helfenstein
 Helfenstein (Habichtswald), a hill in Hesse, Germany
 Château de Helfenstein, a ruined castle near Éguelshardt, Lorraine, France
 8067 Helfenstein, a comet
 Sven Helfenstein (born 1982), Swiss ice hockey player